Rajapalayam railway station is a railway station serving the town of Rajapalayam in Tamil Nadu, India. The current STATION MASTER of this station is I. VINOD KUMAR

The station is a part of the Madurai railway division of the Southern Railway zone and connects the city to various parts of the state as well as the rest of the country.

Location and layout
The railway station is located off the Railway Feeder Road of Rajapalayam.

Lines
The station is part of the line that connects Chennai with places like Madurai, Tiruchirapalli, Coimbatore, and Rameswaram.
 BG single line towards North Madurai via Virudhunagar.
 BG single line towards West Kollam via Tenkasi.

References

External links
 

Madurai railway division
Railway stations in Virudhunagar district